Louis was a well-known parrot from Victoria, British Columbia.  From the time of his reclusive owner's death in 1949 until 1966, he continued to live on his owner's estate, well-provided for in her will, and preventing development of the prime real estate.

History
Victoria Jane Wilson (1878–1949) was born in Victoria and raised very privately by her parents.  At age five, she received Louis as a pet, and later obtained many other birds.  The top floor of her house became an aviary.  Around 1911, Victoria bought an electric car, reportedly in order to take Louis on rides.

Victoria led a reclusive life, entirely at the mansion on Courtney Street where she had been raised, until her death in 1949.  Her will included a large amount of funds to take care of her birds (53 at the time), and Victoria's former servant Wah Wong was paid to be a caretaker, staying at the house to do so.  Louis was well known for enjoying brandy, two bottles per year, though news reports at the time liked to refer to him as a lush.  Eventually, all the birds died except for Louis, whose presence still kept the property from being sold.

In 1966, Louis went to live with Wong.  Louis' move let the Wilson property be developed as a hotel, the Chauteau Victoria, with a restaurant called the Parrot House on the top floor (later renamed "Vista 18").  Wong died soon after taking Louis in, and though his family remained quiet, it has been reported that Louis may have died a few years later, or perhaps as late as 1985.

Today, the top award of Hallmark Society of the Capital Regional District is called the Louis Award, awarded for exceptional heritage building restoration.
Life magazine featured a one-page article on Louis, in the August 9, 1963, issue, titled "The Old Bird Won't Sell".

See also
 List of individual birds

References

External links
 LIFE Aug. 9, 1963

Individual parrots
Victoria, British Columbia
Individual animals in Canada